was a Japanese politician who was Prime Minister of Japan from 1954 to 1956. A conservative, Hatoyama helped oversee the 1955 merger of the Liberal Party and the Democratic Party to create the Liberal Democratic Party (Japan), of which Hatoyama was the first party president and first prime minister, and which would go on to rule Japan for most of the next seven decades.

As prime minister, Hatoyama's signature achievement was restoring official diplomatic relations with the Soviet Union, which had been in abeyance since World War II.

Personal life
Ichirō Hatoyama was, as his name indicates, the first born boy. He was born into a wealthy cosmopolitan family in Tokyo. His father Kazuo Hatoyama (1856–1911) was a Yale graduate (and Speaker of the House of Representatives) and his mother Haruko Hatoyama (1863–1938) was a famous author and the founder of Kyoritsu Women's University. His brother Hideo Hatoyama was a noted jurist.

Ichirō was a Master Mason and a Protestant Christian (Baptist). He was Japan's third postwar Christian Prime Minister.

Iichirō Hatoyama, Ichirō's only son, made a career for himself as a civil servant in the Budget Bureau of the Finance Ministry. Iichirō retired after having achieved the rank of administrative Vice Minister.  In his second career in politics, he rose to become Foreign Minister of Japan in 1976–1977.

One of Ichirō's grandsons, Yukio Hatoyama,  became prime minister in 2009 as a member of the Democratic Party of Japan.

Ichirō Hatoyama died in his Hatoyama Hall house, in Tokyo's Bunkyō district, on 7 March 1959. He was buried in the Yanaka Cemetery, in nearby Taitō district.

Political career
Ichirō was first elected to the House of Representatives as a Rikken Seiyūkai member in 1915, and served continuously until his death in 1959. He was about to become prime minister in 1946, but was barred from politics for five years by Supreme Commander Allied Powers because they thought he had co-operated with the authoritarian government in the 1930s and 1940s. As part of the Occupation's "Reverse Course," Hatoyama was de-purged and allowed to return to politics in 1951.

CIA files that were declassified in 2005 and then publicized in January 2007 by the U.S. National Archives detail a plot by ultranationalists to assassinate  prime minister Shigeru Yoshida and install a more hawkish government led by Ichirō Hatoyama in 1952. The plot was never carried out.

As prime minister in 1955, he restored diplomatic ties with the Soviet Union. A staunch conservative, Hatoyama favored pardons for some of the Class A war criminals who had been sentenced to life imprisonment by the Tokyo Trial. He hoped to revise the Constitution to remove Article 9 and eventually remilitarize Japan. To this end, in 1956 he established a "Constitutional Research Commission" to prepare for the process of constitutional revision.

That same year, Hatoyama attempted to implement his infamous "Hatomander" (ハトマンダー, hatomandā, a portmanteau of Hatoyama and Gerrymander), an attempt to replace Japan's SNTV multi-member constituencies with American-style first-past-the-post single-member districts, which would have made it easier for the LDP to secure the two-thirds of seats in the Lower House of the National Diet needed to revise the Constitution. The plan passed the Lower House of the Diet, but was shelved in the face of intense popular opposition before it could pass the Upper House.

Hatoyama family and freemasonry 

Ichirō and some members of Hatoyama family are known as advocates of fraternity. During the purge against Ichirō (1946–1951), he received an English book The Totalitarian State against Man originally written in German by an Austrian freemason Richard von Coudenhove-Kalergi from a professor of Waseda University Kesazō Ichimura (1898–1950) who wanted Ichirō to translate the English book into Japanese. The English book struck a sympathetic chord in Ichirō, and he began to advocate fraternity, also known as yūai (友愛) in Japanese.

On 29 March 1951, he was initiated as 1st degree of freemason, and on 26 March 1955, passed as 2nd degree mason, and raised as 3rd degree mason.

His grandsons are advocates of fraternity. However, when a Japanese press asked Yukio Hatoyama's office and the masonic grand lodge of Japan whether Yukio Hatoyama was a freemason, his office denied it and the grand lodge of Japan didn't answer it. At least, on his grandson Kunio Hatoyama, the brother of Yukio, on a Japanese TV program Takajin no Money on 25 August 2012, his partner Emily's Australian father was a member of freemasonry. He said so, and said he had swum in a masonic pool with her at Tokyo when he had started to going steady with her.  Although he didn't say he himself was a mason or not, he insisted that he had not been invited to freemasonry, and he guessed his brother Yukio as a freemason.

Yukio and Kunio became the officers of a fraternal organization named Yūai Kyōkai (or Yūai Association) with their sister Kazuko, founded by their grandfather Ichirō who became the first president of the former organization in 1953. And also Ichirō's son Iichirō became the third president of the same former organization.

The granddaughter and two grandsons of Ichiro's founded a fraternal school Hatoyama Yuai-Jyuku at Hatoyama Hall (Hatoyama kaikan) in April 2008.

Honours
From the corresponding article in the Japanese Wikipedia

Grand Cordon of the Order of the Chrysanthemum (1959; posthumous)

See also 
 Hatomander

References

Further reading
 Itoh, Mayumi (2003). The Hatoyama Dynasty: Japanese Political Leadership through the Generations. New York: Palgrave Macmillan. , . .
 Saunavaara, Juha (28 September 2009).  "Occupation Authorities, the Hatoyama Purge and the Making of Japan’s Postwar Political Order". The Asia-Pacific Journal, Vol. 39-2-09.

External links 

 
 Time cover portrait of Ichirō Hatoyama,  14 March 1955

1883 births
1959 deaths
20th-century prime ministers of Japan
Government ministers of Japan
Education ministers of Japan
Ichiro
Democratic Party (Japan, 1954) politicians
Japanese Baptists
Liberal Democratic Party (Japan) politicians
Democratic Liberal Party (Japan) politicians
Liberal Party (Japan, 1945) politicians
Prime Ministers of Japan
Rikken Seiyūkai politicians
20th-century Japanese politicians
Japanese Freemasons
20th-century Baptists
Politicians from Tokyo